Troubled by the Fire is the third studio album by Laura Veirs, released in 2003.

Track listing
"Lost at Seaflower Cove" – 3:39
"Bedroom Eyes" – 4:16
"The Ballad of John Vogelin" – 2:41
"Song My Friends Taught Me" – 4:32
"Cannon Fodder" – 5:51
"Tom Skookum Road" – 2:27
"Tiger Tattoos" – 5:27
"A Shining Lamp" – 1:27
"Ohio Clouds" – 3:58
"Devils' Hootenanny" – 5:03
"Midnight Singer" – 4:39

References

2003 albums
Laura Veirs albums
Bella Union albums
Albums produced by Tucker Martine